The 2010–11 Columbus Blue Jackets season was the team's 11th season for the National Hockey League (NHL) franchise that was established on June 25, 1997.

The Blue Jackets posted a regular season record of 34 wins, 35 losses and 13 overtime/shootout losses for 81 points, failing to qualify for the Stanley Cup playoffs for the second consecutive season.

Off-season
On June 8, 2010, the Blue Jackets announced their new head coach, Scott Arniel, who was previously the head coach of the Manitoba Moose of the American Hockey League (AHL).

On June 17, the Blue Jackets announced their 2010 pre-season schedule. The team will play nine games during the pre-season, including one against a Swedish team, Malmö Redhawks. The game was originally to feature a combined squad featuring players from Malmo and Rögle BK, but these plans fell through as the archrival clubs did not feel that they could compete as a unit.

Regular season

Divisional standings

Conference standings

Playoffs
The Blue Jackets failed to qualify for the playoffs. They last qualified in 2008-09.

Schedule and results

Pre-season

Regular season

Schedule and results
 Green background indicates win (2 points).
 Red background indicates regulation loss (0 points).
 Silver background indicates overtime/shootout loss (1 point).

Player statistics

Skaters

Goaltenders
Note: GP = Games played; TOI = Time on ice (minutes); W = Wins; L = Losses; OT = Overtime losses; GA = Goals against; GAA= Goals against average; SA= Shots against; SV= Saves; Sv% = Save percentage; SO= Shutouts

†Denotes player spent time with another team before joining Blue Jackets. Stats reflect time with the Blue Jackets only.
‡Traded mid-season
Italics denotes franchise record

Awards and records

Awards

Records

Milestones

Transactions
The Blue Jackets have been involved in the following transactions during the 2010–11 season.

Trades

Free agents acquired

Free agents lost

Claimed via waivers

Lost via waivers

Lost via retirement

Player signings

Draft picks
Columbus had eight picks at the 2010 NHL Entry Draft in Los Angeles, California.

See also
 2010–11 NHL season

Farm teams
The American Hockey League's Springfield Falcons and the Central Hockey League's Fort Wayne Komets are the Blue Jackets' minor league affiliates for the 2010–11 season.

References

External links
 2010–11 Columbus Blue Jackets season at ESPN
 2010–11 Columbus Blue Jackets season at Hockey Reference

Columbus Blue Jackets seasons
Columbus Blue Jackets season, 2010-11
Colum
Blue
Blue